Matěj Helebrand (born 19 June 1997) is a professional Czech football defender currently playing for FK Blansko in the Czech National Football League, on loan from SFC Opava.

He made his senior league debut for Opava on 21 August 2016 in a Czech National Football League 3–3 draw at Viktoria Žižkov. On 26 April 2017, he scored the winning goal in Opava's 2–0 win at Mladá Boleslav in the Czech FA Cup semi-finals, helping his Second League team to defeat their fourth First League opponents in a row and advance to the FA Cup final for the first time in club history.

References

External links 
 Matěj Helebrand official international statistics
 
 Matěj Helebrand profile on the SFC Opava official website

Czech footballers
Czech Republic youth international footballers
1997 births
Living people
Czech First League players
Czech National Football League players
SFC Opava players
MFK Vítkovice players
FK Blansko players

Association football defenders